Naari Pharma Pvt. Ltd. is a pharmaceutical company based in Bengaluru, India. Naari was founded on December 17, 2007. The company is involved in manufacturing of Active pharmaceutical ingredients  and Finished Formulations, focusing on the female health segment with an emphasis on high active female hormones.

Infrastructure 

Naari is headquartered in Bengaluru, India. The company’s infrastructure includes manufacturing facilities in Kashipur, India and Rudrapur, India.

Products 

Naari develops and manufactures a large range of women health care products including Active pharmaceutical ingredients (APIs), Formulations, Diagnostics. The products of Naari include:

Active Pharmaceutical Ingredients (APIs)
• Allylestrenol
• Disulfiram
• Estradiol
• Estradiol Benzoate
• Estradiol Valerate
• Ethinylestradiol
• Estriol
• Levonorgestrel
• Lynestrenol
• Nandrolone Decanoate
• Nandrolone Phenylpropionate
• Norethisterone
• Norethisterone Acetate
• Norethisterone Enanthate 
• Thiopental Sodium
• Tibolone
• Tolnaftate

Formulations
• Mifetril (Mifepristone 200 mg)
• Misopro (Misoprostol 200 mcg)
• Fasile (Levonorgestrel BP 0.75 mg)
• Fasile 1.5 (Levonorgestrel BP 1.5 mg)
• Phem 21 (Levonorgestrel 0.15 mg & Ethinylestradiol 0.03 mg Tablets BP)
• Phem 28 (Levonorgestrel 0.15 mg & Ethinylestradiol 0.03 mg Tablets BP with Ferrous Fumarate 60 mg Tablets BP)	
• Anes (Thiopental Sodium for Injection 0.5 gm /1.0 gm)
• Vivant tablets (Allylestrenol 5 mg)
• Regelle tablets (Norethisterone BP 5 mg)

Diagnostics
• U-Chek (HCG pregnancy test kit)	
• Ova -Chek (LH ovulation test kit)

Dienogest

Notes and references

See also 
 List of pharmaceutical companies
 Pharmaceutical industry in India

External links 
 Naari:Official Site
 http://www.contraception.net/
 http://www.who.int/reproductive-health/
 http://phsindia.org/
 http://www.dktinternational.org/
 http://www.psi.org/

Pharmaceutical companies of India